The Turks and Caicos Islands Football Association is the governing body of football in the Turks and Caicos Islands. They control the Turks and Caicos Islands national football team, the MFL League men's league, the Turks and Caicos FA Cup and the WFL League women's league.

Its current president is Sonia Bien-Aime, who replaced Christopher Bryan in 2014.

Association staff

References

External links
 
 Turks and Caicos Islands at the FIFA website
 Turks and Caicos Islands at CONCACAF site

CONCACAF member associations
Football in the Turks and Caicos Islands
1996 establishments in the Turks and Caicos Islands
Sports organizations established in 1996